Margaritaria is a plant genus of the family Phyllanthaceae first published as a genus in 1782. It is the smallest pantropical genus of the Phyllanthaceae and, formerly, of the Euphorbiaceae, widely distributed in tropical and subtropical regions of Asia, Africa, Australia, North and South America, and various oceanic islands.

Species

References

Phyllanthaceae
Phyllanthaceae genera
Pantropical flora
Taxa named by Carl Linnaeus the Younger